Tum Dena Saath Mera may refer to:

 Tum Dena Saath Mera (2011 TV series), a Hindi language Indian drama series, which aired on satellite television network Life OK. 
 Tum Dena Saath Mera (2009 TV series), an Indian television series which is currently broadcasting on DD National.